TinyVM is a small Java Virtual Machine primarily designed for use embedded systems with low memory. In 2000 the project was forked into LeJOS.

References
 Energy-Efficient Programming Environments for Wireless Sensor Networks 
 LeJOS technology

External links
 TinyVM home page

Java virtual machine